The Western Hubei Operation was an engagement between the National Revolutionary Army and Imperial Japanese Army during the Second Sino-Japanese War. Three Infantry, one Cavalry and an artillery Regiment of the 13th Division crossed to the south bank of the Yangtze River near Ichang to attack the Chinese positions there.

References
 Hsu Long-hsuen and Chang Ming-kai, History of The Sino-Japanese War (1937–1945) 2nd Ed., 1971. Translated by Wen Ha-hsiung, Chung Wu Publishing; 33, 140th Lane, Tung-hwa Street, Taipei, Taiwan Republic of China. Pg. 342–344, Map 23

Conflicts in 1941
Western Hopei 1941|Western Hopei Operation
1941 in China
1941 in Japan
Military history of Hubei
March 1941 events